This is a list of notable cold soups. Soups have been made since ancient times. In warm climates, or in summer, many cultures make traditional cold soups.  These soups tend to be lighter than winter soups and typically contain less fat and meat per serving. Some are purely vegetable based but many use light meat or fish stocks.

Cold soups

See also

 List of soups

References